The 1950–51 Michigan Wolverines men's ice hockey team represented the University of Michigan in intercollegiate college ice hockey during the 1950–51 NCAA men's ice hockey season. The head coach was Vic Heyliger and the team captain was Gil Burford. The team won the 1951 NCAA Men's Ice Hockey Tournament. The team's leading scorer was Neil Celley, who broke Michigan's single-season scoring record with 79 points (40 goals, 39 assists) and led the NCAA in scoring.

Standings

Schedule
During the season Michigan compiled a 22–4–1 record, the fourth consecutive year that the team won at least 80% of their games. Their schedule was as follows.

* Denotes overtime periods

Roster and scoring statistics

Goaltending Statistics

1951 national championship

(W1) Michigan vs. (E1) Brown

Bob Heathcott, Gil Burford, John Matchefts and Neil Celley were named to the All-Tournament Team

Notes
Less than year after winning the tournament, Hal Downes was shot down in his B-26 over North Korea and was declared MIA. Though all living POWs were returned to the US in 1953 Downes remained listed as MIA until his remains were returned in 2018.

See also 
1951 NCAA Division I Men's Ice Hockey Tournament
List of NCAA Division I Men's Ice Hockey Tournament champions

References

External links 
Official Site
History of the 1950–51 team, at page 6

Michigan Wolverines men's ice hockey seasons
Michigan
Michigan
Michigan
Michigan
1951 in sports